Polynucleobacter campilacus is an aerobic, catalase- and oxidase-positive, chemo-organotrophic, nonmotile, free-living bacterium of the genus Polynucleobacter., The type strain was isolated from Lake Feldsee located in the Southern Black Forest in Germany. The species epithet "campilacus" refers to the origin of the type strain from this lake. The complete genome sequence of the strain was determined. Among the described Polynucleobacter species, P. campilacus is closest related to P. hirudinilacicola.

References 

Burkholderiaceae
Bacteria described in 2018